A Sunday Christian or Sunday morning Christian (also once-a-weeker) is a term of denunciation used to refer to someone who typically attends Christian church services on Sundays, but is presumed or witnessed not to adhere to the doctrines or rules of the religion (either actively or passively), or refuses to register as a church member. These members are sometimes considered to be hypocritical in how or what they practice due in part to their confusion or cherry-picking how they live their religion.

See also
Cafeteria Christianity
Cultural Christians
Lapsed Catholic
Biblical law in Christianity
Nondenominational Christianity

References

Religious slurs for people
Christian terminology
Sunday
English phrases